Daniel J. Sweeney  (January 28, 1868 – July 13, 1913) was a professional baseball player.  He played outfielder in the National League for the Louisville Colonels.

External links

1868 births
1913 deaths
Major League Baseball outfielders
Louisville Colonels players
Baseball players from Pennsylvania
19th-century baseball players
Hazleton Pugilists players
Shenandoah Hungarian Rioters players
Oakland Colonels players
Akron Akrons players
San Francisco Friscos players
San Francisco Metropolitans players
Oakland Morans players
Stockton River Pirates players
Sacramento Senators players
Rock Island-Moline Islanders players
Syracuse Stars (minor league baseball) players
New Haven Texas Steers players
Springfield Ponies players